Sidymella is a genus of spider in the family Thomisidae, found in South America, Australia and New Zealand. It was originally named Sidyma, but this was later found to have been used already for a genus of moths.

Taxonomy
The genus was first erected by Eugène Simon in 1895 under the name Sidyma, with the type species Sidyma lucida. However, it was later discovered that there was a moth genus Sidyma, named in 1856, so the genus name was preoccupied. The replacement name Sidymella was provided by Strand in 1942.

Species
, the World Spider Catalog accepted 19 species:

Sidymella angularis (Urquhart, 1885) – New Zealand
Sidymella angulata (Urquhart, 1885) – New Zealand
Sidymella benhami (Hogg, 1910) – New Zealand, Stewart Is.
Sidymella bicuspidata (L. Koch, 1874) – Queensland
Sidymella excavata (Machado & Guzati, 2019) – Colombia, Ecuador, Peru, Argentina
Sidymella furcillata (Keyserling, 1880) – Brazil, Argentina
Sidymella hirsuta (L. Koch, 1874) – Queensland
Sidymella jordanensis (Soares, 1944) – Brazil
Sidymella kochi (Simon, 1908) – Western Australia
Sidymella kolpogaster (Lise, 1973) – Brazil
Sidymella lampei (Strand, 1913) – Victoria
Sidymella longipes (L. Koch, 1874) – Queensland
Sidymella longispina (Mello-Leitão, 1943) – Brazil
Sidymella lucida (Keyserling, 1880) (type species) – Colombia to Argentina
Sidymella multispinulosa (Mello-Leitão, 1944) – Brazil
Sidymella nigripes (Mello-Leitão, 1947) – Brazil
Sidymella rubrosignata (L. Koch, 1874) – New South Wales
Sidymella sigillata (Mello-Leitão, 1941) – Uruguay
Sidymella trapezia (L. Koch, 1874) – Australia

References

Thomisidae
Araneomorphae genera
Spiders of Australia
Spiders of South America
Spiders of New Zealand